Bendigo Senior Secondary College (BSSC), is an Australian government-funded co-educational secondary school for Year 11 and Year 12 students located in the centre of Bendigo, Victoria. It is the largest provider of VCE, VET and VCAL in the state of Victoria.

Bendigo has four government-funded Year 7 to 10 secondary schools: Eaglehawk Secondary College, Bendigo South East College, Crusoe College and Weeroona College Bendigo. Students from these schools transition to BSSC for their final two years of schooling in Years 11 and 12.

History 

The Bendigo Continuation School opened on 27 April 1907, with the aim of preparing students for entry into the public service, teacher training, university or other education. In 1912, the school was renamed as Bendigo High School. The school incorporated nearby buildings such as the Sandhurst Corporate High School (later St Andrew's College) and eventually the James King Hall and administration block were built in 1930. The former Bendigo Supreme Court was used to serve as the music rooms when it was obtained in 1959, after the relocation of Bendigo Girls' High School. Other additions include the Alexander Wing (1967) and the Commonwealth Library (1977).

The last year Bendigo High School provided the full range of secondary school courses from Years 7 to 12 was in 1975. In 1976, the school became Victoria's first senior high school providing courses in only Year 11 and Year 12. The school phased in this change with the removal of the lower years which was complete in 1979. In 1984, the school was renamed as Bendigo Senior High School. In 1990, the school was renamed as Bendigo Senior Secondary College.

In 1991, a building program saw the construction of new buildings, with an overall upgrade all of the facilities starting from 1995. The site is listed on the Victorian Heritage Register.

Notable achievements and projects 
In 2001, Bendigo Senior Secondary College was the first government school in the world to be accredited with the Council of International Schools. In 2011, BSSC was bench-marked again and welcomed international scrutiny.

NETschool is an extension of BSSC and offers VCE, VCAL and VET. It provides curriculum access for 15–18 year-old students who have been outside mainstream schooling or training.

BSSC also runs an online program which they deliver the college program through. It was setup to help students in other schools in Victoria. This program is expected to continue to expand in the future.

Notable alumni
Arts and entertainment
 Nick Bland (born 1973 ), cartoonist and writer. Nick's books, which include The Very Cranky Bear, The Wrong Book and The Runaway Hug, have been recognised by many different awards, including the Children's Book Council of Australia, the Kids Own Australian Literature Awards and the Australian Book Industry Awards.
 Yergurl (born 2000), singer-songwriter, producer, and 2018 Triple J Unearthed High finalist

Business
 Frank Milne (born 1946) – economist and finance theorist

Politics
 Nicola Rosenblum, former High Commissioner to Brunei  and the youngest head of mission to date
 Jim Short (born James Robert Short, 1936), Federal Liberal MP and Assistant Treasurer to the Howard Government

Sport
 Nick Dal Santo (born 1984), AFL footballer for St Kilda  and North Melbourne 
 Ben McGlynn (born 1985), former AFL footballer for Hawthorn  and Sydney , assistant coach at St Kilda 
 Kobe Mutch (born 1998), former AFL footballer for Essendon 
 Scott Selwood (born 1990), former AFL footballer for Geelong  and West Coast 
 Dean Solomon (born 1980), former AFL footballer for Essendon  and Fremantle 
 Chris Tarrant (born 1980), former AFL footballer for Collingwood  and Fremantle 
 Jeff Tho (born Jeffery Tho, 1988), Australian representative at the 2010 and 2014 Commonwealth Games in badminton
 Glenn Warfe (born 1984), Australian representative to the 2012 Olympic Games in badminton
 Jack Ginnivan- AFL

Notable buildings
 James King Hall – started 1929 and completed 1930. The building was named after Headmaster James King who served between September 1907 to the end of 1923.
 Ron Lake Building – opened 1994. The current building stands on the ground where the caretaker residence used to be, which had a tennis court and playing ground.
 Supreme Court – started 1858 and used to 1896. Then turned into Bendigo Continuation School in 1907 till 1912. Then Bendigo Teachers College in 1929 till 1958. Then in 1959 it became part of Bendigo High School / Bendigo Senior Secondary College
 The Police Barracks – completed 1860 and served till 1920. From 1941 it was used by Bendigo High School as an Art Room until 1967. In 1999 it was refurbished and leased to Bendigo Senior Secondary College.
 Old Gold Quadrangle - Original School Building completed 1870 and new additions completed 1914. The Quadrangle was used for school assemblies for many years.
 Alexander Wing - opened 1967. It was opened in celebration of the school's diamond jubilee and was named after former student and principal Charles Alexander. It was later renovated in 2017 to include a new VCAL center, library, classrooms and study areas.
 The Commonwealth Science Building - opened 1977. It was opened with help from the Commonwealth science grant. The ground floor originally had 2 science rooms. It was extended in 1996 to house the library, the first floor housed the library from 1977 til 1996 when it was converted to the multimedia center. In 2018 the ground floor was renovated into 4 new classrooms, study area, and renamed to the Business Center.

Notable landmarks
 King Memorial Gates – erected in 1933. Erected in memory of James King with the inscription Non Omnis Moriar ("I Shall Not Wholly Die"). This was the main entrance of the school until 1957.
 Memorial Gates and Memorial Steps – started 1956 and completed 1957. It was built as a war memorial to "those members of the school who served and suffered that our way of life might be preserved".

Awards and nominations

Australian Training Awards
School Pathways to VET Awards

! 
|-
! scope="row"| 2011
| rowspan="3"| Bendigo Senior Secondary College
| rowspan="3"| School Pathways to VET Award
| rowspan="3" 
| rowspan="3"| 
|-
! scope="row"| 2014
|-
! scope="row"| 2015
|}

VET in Schools Excellence Awards

! 
|-
! scope="row"| 2012
| rowspan="2"| Bendigo Senior Secondary College
| rowspan="2"| VET in Schools Excellence Award
| rowspan="2" 
| rowspan="2"| 
|-
! scope="row"| 2016
|}

See also
 Bendigo South East College
 Crusoe College
 Weeroona College Bendigo
 List of schools in Victoria

References

Notes

External links
 

1907 establishments in Australia
Buildings and structures in Bendigo
Public high schools in Victoria (Australia)
Educational institutions established in 1907
Education in Bendigo
Rock Eisteddfod Challenge participants
Victorian Heritage Register Loddon Mallee (region)
Bendigo